Bee Creek is a stream in Monroe County in the U.S. state of Missouri. It is a tributary of Elk Fork Salt River.

The stream flows east and then north passing under Missouri routes C and AA. It enters the Elk Fork approximately four miles southwest of Paris.

Bee Creek was so named due to the presence of honeybees in the area.

See also
List of rivers of Missouri

References

Rivers of Monroe County, Missouri
Rivers of Missouri